Caleb is a Hebrew masculine given name meaning faithful. It can also mean "whole hearted" or "loyalty."

Given name

Biblical figures
Caleb, the son of Jephunneh, an important figure in the Hebrew Bible/Christian Old Testament
Caleb, son of Hezron, one of the three sons of Hezron, mentioned in the Book of Chronicles

Actors
Caleb Foote (born 1993), American actor
Caleb Landry Jones (born 1989), American actor
Caleb McLaughlin (born 2001), American actor
Caleb Ross (born 1981), New Zealander film and television actor
Caleb Spivak, American actor

Athletes
Caleb Aekins (born 1997), New Zealander rugby league footballer
Caleb Agada (born 1994), Nigerian-Canadian basketball player
Caleb Baldwin (boxer) (1769-1827), English boxer
Caleb Binge (born 1993), Australian professional rugby league footballer
Caleb Brantley (born 1994), American football player
Caleb Clarke (rugby union) (born 1999), New Zealand rugby union player
Caleb Clarke (soccer) (born 1993), Canadian former soccer player
Caleb Crone (1919-1958), Irish Gaelic footballer
Caleb Daniel (born 1996), Australian rules footballer
Caleb Ekuban (born 1994), Italian footballer
Caleb Ekwegwo (born 1988), Nigerian footballer
Caleb Ewan (born 1994), Australian cyclist
Caleb Farley (born 1998), American football player
Caleb Folan (born 1982), English footballer
Caleb Graham (born 2000), Australian rules footballer
Caleb Hanie (born 1985), American football player
Caleb Houstan (born 2003), Canadian basketball player
Caleb Huntley (born 1998), American football player
Caleb Johnson (American football) (born 1998), American football player
Caleb Jones (American football) (born 1999), American football player
Caleb Marchbank (born 1996), Australian rules footballer
Caleb Martin (1924–1994), American football player
Caleb Patterson-Sewell (born 1987), American professional footballer
Caleb Ralph (born 1977), New Zealand rugby union footballer
Caleb Richards (born 1998), English footballer
Caleb Shepherd (born 1993), New Zealander rowing cox
Caleb Shudak (born 1997), American football player
Caleb Stanko (born 1993), American soccer player
Caleb Swanigan (1997–2022), American professional basketball player
Caleb Thielbar (born 1987), American professional baseball player
Caleb Timu (born 1994), New Zealand-born Australian rugby footballer
Caleb Williams (born 2002), American football player
Caleb Wilson (born 1996), American football player
Caleb Zady (born 1999), Ivorian professional footballer

Politicians
Caleb J. Anderson (1910–1996), Swedish Social Democrat
Caleb Atwater (1778-1867), American politician, historian, and early archaeologist
Caleb Ayer (1813-1883), American politician
Caleb Banks (1659–1696), English politician, member of the House of Commons
Caleb P. Bennett (1758-1836), American soldier and politician
Caleb Cushing (1800–1879), American statesman and diplomat, Congressman from Massachusetts and Attorney General
Caleb Ellis (1767-1816), American politician and lawyer
Caleb Frostman (born 1984), American politician 
Caleb Hanna (born 1999), American politician as a Republican member of the West Virginia House of Delegates
Caleb C. Harris (1836-1904), American farmer, physician, and politician
Caleb Claiborne Herbert (1814-1867), Confederate politician
Caleb Hopkins (Upper Canada), (1786-1880), Canadian farmer and politician
Caleb Jenner (1830-1890), English-born politician in colonial Victoria (Australia), member of the Victorian Legislative Council
Caleb Jones (politician) (born 1980), American politician
Caleb R. Layton (1851-1830), American politician
Caleb Lomax (1695–1730), British landowner and politician
Caleb J. McNulty (1816-1846), American lawyer, newspaper editor and politician
Caleb Powell (1793-1881), Irish Repeal Association and Whig politician
Caleb Powers (1869–1932), United States Representative from Kentucky and Secretary of State of Kentucky
Caleb Rice (1792–1873), American politician and businessman
Caleb Rodney (1767-1840), American merchant and politician
Caleb Rowden, American politician
Caleb Blood Smith (1808-1864),,United States Representative from Indiana
Caleb Stark (1759-1838), American state senator
Caleb Stetson (1801-1885), American businessman and politician from the Commonwealth of Massachusetts
Caleb Strong (1745–1819), lawyer and politician, sixth and tenth Governor of Massachusetts
Caleb Newbold Taylor (1813-1887) was a Republican member of the United States House of Representatives from Pennsylvania
Caleb Walton West (1844-1909), American politician and Governor of Utah Territory  
Caleb Wright (1810-1898), English politician

Other
Caleb Angas (1782-1860), English agriculturist
Caleb Ashworth (1722–1775), English dissenting tutor
Caleb Bonham (born 1986), American businessman and television personality
Caleb Bradham (1867–1934), inventor of Pepsi-Cola
Caleb Carr (born 1955), American military historian and author
Caleb Cheeshahteaumuck (died 1665 or 1666), the first Native American graduate of Harvard University
Caleb Crain, American writer
Caleb de Casper, American singer and performing artist
Caleb Deschanel (born 1944), Franco-American cinematographer
Caleb Evans (geologist) (1831-1886), English geologist
Caleb Finch, professor studying ageing in human beings
Caleb Fleming (1698-1779), English dissenting minister and Polemicist
Caleb Followill (born 1982), lead singer and rhythm guitarist of the rock band Kings of Leon
Caleb Garling, American writer
Caleb V. Haynes (1895-1966), American Air Force major general
Caleb Jeacocke (1706–1786), English baker and businessman
Caleb Lewis (born 1978), Australian playwright
Caleb Cain Marcus, American photographer
Calev Myers (21st century), American-Israeli lawyer
Caleb Hillier Parry (1755-1822), Anglo-Welsh physician
Caleb Pusey, (c. 1650–1727), friend and business partner of William Penn, provincial supreme court justice
Caleb Quaye (born 1948), English guitarist
Caleb Rotheram (1694–1752), English dissenting minister and tutor
Caleb Saleeby (1878-1940), English physician, writer, and journalist
Caleb Schaber (1973-2009), American artist and journalist
Caleb Silver, American journalist
Caleb Simper (1856-1942), English composer and church organist
Caleb Andrew Stewart (1888–1959), Scottish mathematician
Caleb Whitefoord (1734-1810), Scottish merchant, diplomat, and political satirist
Caleb Thomas Winchester (1847-1920), American English scholar

Fictional characters
 Caleb Garth, a character in the George Eliot novel Middlemarch
 Caleb Trask, a major character in the John Steinbeck novel East of Eden
 Caleb Lambert, the son of Gary and Caroline Lambert in Jonathan Franzen's novel The Corrections
 Caleb Bradley, a corporate swindler in Ayn Rand's novel The Fountainhead
 Caleb Temple, main character in the 1995 television series American Gothic
 Caleb (Buffy the Vampire Slayer), a villain in the Buffy the Vampire Slayer television series
 Caleb Nichol, in The O.C. television series
 Caleb (computer game character), protagonist of the computer game Blood and its sequel, Blood II: The Chosen
 Caleb (W.I.T.C.H.), in the comic book and animated television series W.I.T.C.H.
 Caleb Morley, vampire in the soap opera Port Charles
 Caleb Lansing-Gant, part-human part-machine protagonist of the UK game show Mission: 2110
 Caleb Rivers, character from the TV series Pretty Little Liars
 Caleb Widogast, one of the main characters from the American Dungeons & Dragons web series Critical Role
 Caleb Williams, the main character in the William Godwin novel Things as They Are; or, The Adventures of Caleb Williams
 Caleb Prior, the brother of protagonist Tris Prior in the Divergent series and film of the same name
 Caleb Smith, a computer programmer tasked with evaluating an artificial being, in the film Ex Machina
 Caleb Dingle, character from the TV series Emmerdale
 Caleb Dume, real name of Jedi Kanan Jarrus in Star Wars Rebels
 Caleb, character from the Netflix show Big Mouth
 Caleb, recurrent character from the Syfy show Helix in Season 2
 Caleb, character from the HBO show Westworld in Season 3
 Caleb John Gosche, a cannibal who appears in Seasons 5 and 6 of Brooklyn Nine-Nine
 Caleb Malphas, a demon from Sherrilyn Kenyon's teen fiction series, The Chronicles Of Nick.
 Caleb Quinn, also known as "The Deathslinger", who uses a harpoon gun for his "killer ability", in the videogame Dead by Daylight
 Caleb Covington, a character in Netflix's Julie and the Phantoms.

See also
Kaleb (name)

References

Hebrew masculine given names
English masculine given names
Modern names of Hebrew origin